The 14521 / 22 Delhi Junction - Ambala Cantonment Junction Intercity Express is an Express train belonging to Indian Railways Northern Railway zone that runs between  and  in India.

Coaches
The 14521 / 22 Delhi Junction - Ambala Cantonment Junction Intercity Express has one AC Chair Car, ten general unreserved & two SLR (seating with luggage rake) coaches . It does not carry a pantry car coach.

As is customary with most train services in India, coach composition may be amended at the discretion of Indian Railways depending on demand.

Service

Routing

Traction
As the route is going to be electrified, a   based WAP-7 electric locomotive pulls the train to its destination.

References

External links
14521 Intercity Express at India Rail Info
14522 Intercity Express at India Rail Info

Intercity Express (Indian Railways) trains
Rail transport in Haryana
Rail transport in Uttar Pradesh
Rail transport in Delhi
Transport in Delhi
Transport in Ambala